Jessica Walter (born 14 October 1984) is a Liechtensteiner former alpine skier who competed in the 2006 Winter Olympics.

Career
Walter was born in Vaduz and represented the Skiclub Schaan. Walter won silver at the World Junior Alpine Skiing Championships 2004 in Maribor, representing her country in the Giant Slalom. Between 2002 and 2006, she competed in 17 FIS Alpine Ski World Cup events, qualifying for three second run races for classification. Her best World Cup result came in February 2004 at Zwiesel in the Slalom where she finished in 17th position.

She competed the 2006 Winter Olympics in Torino finishing 32nd in the Slalom. She was also the chosen flagbearer of Liechtenstein for the opening ceremony.

Personal life
Walter resides in Planken, Liechtenstein. Her mother is Petra Wenzel who competed in Alpine Skiing at the 1980 and 1984 Winter Olympics.  Her cousin is olympic medal winning skier, Tina Weirather.

References

1984 births
Living people
Liechtenstein female alpine skiers
Olympic alpine skiers of Liechtenstein
Alpine skiers at the 2006 Winter Olympics